In mathematics, the Wallman compactification, generally called Wallman–Shanin compactification is a compactification of T1 topological spaces that was constructed by .

Definition
The points of the Wallman compactification ωX of a space X are the maximal proper filters in the poset of closed subsets of X. Explicitly, a point of ωX is a family  of closed nonempty subsets of X such that  is closed under finite intersections, and is maximal among those families that have these properties. For every closed subset F of X, the class ΦF of points of ωX containing F is closed in ωX. The topology of ωX is generated by these closed classes.

Special cases
For normal spaces, the Wallman compactification is essentially the same as the Stone–Čech compactification.

See also 
 Lattice (order)
 Pointless topology

References

General topology
Compactification (mathematics)